Mesothen ignea is a moth of the subfamily Arctiinae. It was described by Herbert Druce in 1898. It is found in Mexico.

References

Mesothen (moth)
Moths described in 1898